Vasili Vasilyevich Merkuryev (6 April 1904 – 12 May 1978) was a Soviet actor, stage director and drama teacher. He was named People's Artist of the USSR in 1960.

Biography
Vasili Merkuryev was born in 1904 into a mixed Russian-German family. His father Vasily Ilyich Merkuryev was a Russian laborer turned a merchant. He ran a successful business selling tar and fish. His mother Anna Ivanovna Grossen was of German descent. She emigrated from Switzerland along with her brother Heinrich. Vasili was the fourth of their six sons.

He was raised in his native town of Ostrov and became an actor of the local theater at the age of 16. In 1921 he moved to Petrograd and entered the Saint Petersburg State Theatre Arts Academy which he finished in 1926. He later returned to the academy to work as a teacher and became a professor in 1961. Between 1926 and 1937 Merkuryev had worked in five different drama theaters, all based in Leningrad. In 1937 he entered the Alexandrinsky Theatre where he served till his death, both as an actor and stage director.

He turned to cinema in 1924 and played a small part in the 9 January propaganda movie. His next role happened only 10 years later in a social drama Engineer Gof (also known as Land Ahead) directed by Rashel Milman. Although he played the main part, the movie turned unsuccessful. He met Irina Meyerhold during the filming process and married her.

Between 1935 and 1974 Merkuryev appeared in 58 films. He is mostly remembered for his comedy roles in movies such as True Friends (1954), Heavenly Slug (1945) and Cinderella (1947). He also played one of the main parts in the war drama The Cranes Are Flying directed by Mikhail Kalatozov that won the Palme d'Or at the 1958 Cannes Film Festival.

He continued his theater and movie career when the war started. During the evacuation he served as a director of the Narym Theater (1942-1944), as well as a director of the Novosibirsk Youth Theatre in 1944-1945.

Merkuryev died on 12 May 1978 in Leningrad. He was buried in the Volkovo Cemetery.

Family
Vasili Merkuryev was married to Irina Meyerhold  an actress, daughter of the acclaimed Russian/Soviet stage director Vsevolod Meyerhold, also of German descent. Together they had two daughters (Anna and Ekaterina) and one son  Pyotr Merkuryev (1943—2010), who also became a prominent Soviet/Russian actor and musicologist.

Merkuryev had five brothers, each of them lived a very different and tragic life.

 Leonid (1896—1915) was killed during World War I.
 Alexandr (1898—1942) lived in Leningrad and starved to death during the Leningrad Blockade.
 Yevgeni (1900) was a Russian composer and conductor who left Russia after the October Revolution with his German uncle and was never heard from ever again.
 Pyotr (1906—1940) was arrested in 1939 during the Stalinist repressions and died in prison. His children  Vitaly, Yevgeni and Natalia - were adopted by Vasili. He also named his own son in the memory of his brother. Yevgeni Merkuryev (1936—2007) became a famous Soviet/Russian actor as well.
 Vladimir died at the age of 9.

During the war Vasili Merkuryev also adopted two children who had lost their parents. They had lived with him up till 1947 when their mother was found. By that time Merkuryev's family consisted of 14 people.

Selected filmography

 Girl Friends (1936)
 The Return of Maxim (1937)
 Professor Mamlock (1938)
 The Vyborg Side (1939)
 Tanker "Derbent" (1941)
 Heavenly Slug (1945)
 The Great Glinka (1946)
 The Vow (1946)
 Cinderella (1947)
 The Battle of Stalingrad (1949)
 True Friends (1954)
 Twelfth Night (1955)
 The Cranes are Flying (1957)
 Splendid Days (1960)
 Chronicle of Flaming Years (1961)
 Moscow-Cassiopeia (1973)

References

External links

 
 
 Great Soviet Encyclopedia, Tome 16, ed. by Prokhorov A.M., Moscow, 1974
 At First I Was a Kid: A Book about the Parents by Pyotr Merkuryev-Meyerhold, Moscow, 2001 (autobiography) 
 Merkuryev, Meyerhold's Grandson a Top Secret interview (in Russian)
 More Than Love by Russia-K (in Russian)

1904 births
1978 deaths
People from Ostrov, Pskov Oblast
People from Ostrovsky Uyezd
Communist Party of the Soviet Union members
Russian people of German descent
Soviet male film actors
Soviet male stage actors
Soviet drama teachers
Russian drama teachers
Russian State Institute of Performing Arts alumni
People's Artists of the USSR
People's Artists of the RSFSR
Honored Artists of the RSFSR
Stalin Prize winners
Recipients of the Order of Lenin
Recipients of the Order of the Red Banner of Labour